Ciarán Clarke (born 1993) is an Irish hurler who plays as a left corner-forward for the Antrim senior team.

Biography
Born in Ballycastle, County Antrim, Clarke first arrived on the inter-county scene at the age of sixteen when he first linked up with the Antrim minor team, before later joining the under-21 side. He made his senior debut during the 2013 championship. Clarke immediately became a regular member of the starting fifteen and has won one Ulster medal.

Clarke has been a member of the Ulster inter-provincial team on a number of occasions, Fenton won three Railway Cup medals. At club level he plays with Ballycastle McQuillan.

Honours

Team

Antrim
National League Division 2A (1): 2020
Joe McDonagh Cup (1): 2020
Ulster Senior Hurling Championship (1): 2013
Ulster Under-21 Hurling Championship (1): 2013
Ulster Minor Hurling Championship (2): 2009, 2010

References

1993 births
Living people
Ballycastle McQuillan hurlers
Antrim inter-county hurlers
Ulster inter-provincial hurlers